Arthur Bloch Park is a multi-use stadium in Johannesburg, Gauteng, South Africa. It is currently used mostly for football matches and is the home venue of Yebo Yes United F.C. in the Vodacom League. The park is named after Arthur Bloch, a city councillor and Chairman of Rangers Football Club.

Sports venues in Johannesburg
Soccer venues in South Africa